Emily Sara-Claire Maddison (born 1999) is a Jamaican model and beauty pageant titleholder who won Miss Jamaica Universe 2018. She represented Jamaica at the Miss Universe 2018 pageant.

Personal life 
Maddison was born and raised in Kingston, Jamaica. She went to Campion College.

Pageantry

Miss Universe Jamaica 2018 
Maddison was crowned as Miss Universe Jamaica 2018 was held at the Jamaica Pegasus Hotel in Kingston, Jamaica on 24 August 2018. She succeeded outgoing Miss Universe Jamaica 2017 and Miss Universe 2017 2nd runner-up, Davina Bennett.

Miss Universe 2018 
Maddison represented Jamaica in Miss Universe 2018 held on 17 December 2018 in Bangkok, Thailand where she placed among the Top 20.

References

External links
Miss Jamaica official website

Living people
1999 births
Miss Universe 2018 contestants
People from Kingston, Jamaica
Jamaican female models
Jamaican beauty pageant winners